Pątnów may refer to the following places in Poland:
Pątnów, Lower Silesian Voivodeship (south-west Poland)
Pątnów, Łódź Voivodeship (central Poland)
Pątnów, Konin a district of Konin (central Poland)
Pątnów Power Station